Andrea Rispoli (born 29 September 1988) is an Italian footballer who plays as a right-back for  club Cosenza.

Career

Brescia
Born in Cava de' Tirreni, Campania, Rispoli started his professional career at Brescia Calcio. Having played for the reserve team from 2005 to 2008, he made his professional debut with the first team during the 2007–08 Serie B season.

Parma and loans
In January 2010, Rispoli was sold to Parma F.C. in a co-ownership deal for €3.5 million, on a -year contract. Concurrently, Alessandro Budel and Nicolás Córdova moved to Brescia in a co-ownership deal for €2.5 million and €1 million respectively, who were free agents  years ago. Rispoli returned to Brescia on loan until 30 June 2010.

On 30 August 2010, Rispoli left for fellow Serie A team U.S. Lecce on loan along with Manuel Coppola. In June 2011, both Brescia and Parma gave up the retained registration rights to the opposite side for free.

On 1 July 2011, Rispoli and Paolo Castellini were exchanged with Jonathan Biabiany.

After Sampdoria did not buy him, on 3 July 2012 he left for Calcio Padova, once more on loan.

Palermo
On 2 February 2015, he moved to Palermo in a temporary deal, with an option to purchase. At the end of year he was released from Parma, due to the club's bankruptcy, and signed a four-year contract with Palermo.

He was released on 30 June 2019 after his expiring contract was not renewed; soon afterwards, Palermo was excluded from Serie B.

Lecce
On 13 August 2019, Rispoli signed Serie A club Lecce.

Crotone
On 8 September 2020, Rispoli signed a 2-year contract with Crotone. On 31 August 2021, the contract was terminated by mutual consent.

Return to Parma
On 9 December 2021, he returned to Parma in Serie B.

Cosenza
On 9 July 2022, Rispoli signed with Cosenza in Serie B.

International career
On 12 August 2009, Rispoli made his debut with the Italy U-21 scoring a goal in the friendly against Russia. He played the second round of 2011 UEFA European Under-21 Football Championship qualification, against Luxembourg as a sub of Mattia Mustacchio. He returned to the squad for the play-offs.

References

External links
 FIGC  
 Football.it Profile  
 

Living people
1988 births
People from Cava de' Tirreni
Association football defenders
Italian footballers
Italy under-21 international footballers
Brescia Calcio players
Parma Calcio 1913 players
U.S. Lecce players
U.C. Sampdoria players
Calcio Padova players
Ternana Calcio players
F.C. Crotone players
Cosenza Calcio players
Serie A players
Serie B players
Sportspeople from the Province of Salerno
Footballers from Campania